Renārs Doršs (born 13 October 1985) is a Latvian alpine skier. He competed in two events at the 2006 Winter Olympics.

References

1985 births
Living people
Latvian male alpine skiers
Olympic alpine skiers of Latvia
Alpine skiers at the 2006 Winter Olympics
People from Sigulda